Kapila, also referred to as Cakradhanus, is a sage in Hindu tradition. According to Bhagavata Purana, he is the son of the sage Kardama and Devahuti, the daughter of the Svayambhuva Manu. Kardama had nine daughters, who were very learned and went ahead to marry Marici, as well as other great sages. When he came of age, Kapila is most well-known as the founder of the Samkhya school of Hindu philosophy. Kapila of Samkhya fame is considered a Vedic sage, estimated to have lived in the 6th-century BCE, or the 7th-century BCE. His home was in Mithila. His influence on Buddha and Buddhism have long been the subject of scholarly studies.

According to the Brahmanda Purana, Kapila is described to be an incarnation of Vishnu: "Bhagavān Nārāyaṇa will protect us all. The Lord of the universe has now been born in the world as Kapilācārya."

Many historic personalities in Hinduism and Jainism, mythical figures, pilgrimage sites in Indian religion, as well as an ancient variety of cow, are named after Kapila, or share his name.

Biography
The name Kapila appears in many texts, and it is likely that these names refer to different people. The most famous reference is to the sage Kapila with his student Āsuri, who in the Indian tradition, are considered as the first masters of Samkhya school of Hindu philosophy. While he pre-dates Buddha, it is unclear which century he lived in, with some suggesting 6th-century BCE. Others place him in the 7th century BCE. This places him in the late Vedic period (1500 BCE to 500 BCE), and he has been called a Vedic sage.

Kapila is credited with authoring an influential sutra, called Samkhya-sutra (also called Kapila-sutra), which aphoristically presents the dualistic philosophy of Samkhya. These sutras were explained in another well studied text of Hinduism called the Samkhyakarika. Beyond his Samkhya philosophy, he appears in many dialogues of Hindu texts, such as in explaining and defending the principle of ahimsa (non-violence) in the Mahabharata.

Hinduism 
Kapila is the tenth child of sage Kardama and Devahūti. Kardama is provided a boon by Narayana that he would himself be born as his son. After attaining this, Kardama wished to leave for the forest for penance and research and Vedic study. Kardama had nine daughters who were very learned and went ahead to marry great sages mentioned in ancient Indian history. Kala married Marichi, Anusuya married Atri, Arundhati married Vashishtha, Havirbhu married Pulastya, and Shanti married Atharvan.

Vedic texts 
The Rigveda X.27.16 mentions Kapila (daśānām ekam kapilam) which the 14th-century Vedic commentator Sayana thought refers to a sage; a view which Chakravarti in 1951 and Larson in 1987 consider unreliable, with Chakravarti suggesting that the word refers to one of the Maruts, while Larson and Bhattacharya state kapilam in that verse means "tawny" or "reddish-brown"; as is also translated by Griffith.

The Śata-piṭaka Series on the Śākhās of the Yajurveda – estimated to have been composed between 1200 and 1000 BCE – mention of a Kapila Śākhā situated in the Āryāvarta, which implies a Yajurveda school is named after Kapila. The term Kapileya, meaning "clans of Kapila", occurs in the Aitareya Brahmana VII.17 but provides no information on the original Kapila. The pariśiṣṭa (addenda) of the Atharvaveda (at XI.III.3.4) mentions Kapila, Āsuri and Pañcaśikha in connection with a libation ritual for whom tarpana is to be offered. In verse 5.2 of Shvetashvatara Upanishad, states Larson, both the terms Samkhya and Kapila appear, with Kapila meaning colour as well as a "seer" (Rishi) with the phrase "ṛṣiṃ prasūtaṃ kapilam ... tam agre.."; which when compared to other verses of the Shvetashvatara Upanishad Kapila likely construes to Rudra and Hiranyagarbha. However, Max Muller is of view that Hiranyagarbha, namely Kapila in this context, varies with the tenor of the Upanishad, is distinct and is later used to link Kapila and assign the authorship of Sankya system to Hiranyagarbha in reverence for the philosophical system.

Puranas 
Kapila, states George Williams, lived long before the composition of the Epics and the Puranas, and his name is coopted in various later composed mythologies.

As an ascetic and as sleeping Vishnu: In the Brahma Purana, when the evil king Vena abandoned the Vedas, declared that he is the only creator of dharma, and broke all limits of righteousness, and is killed, Kapila advises hermits to churn Vena's thigh from which emerged Nishadas, and his right hand from which Prthu originated who made earth productive again. Kapila and hermits then went to Kapilasangama, a holy place where rivers meet. The Brahma Purana also mentions Kapila in the context of Sagara's 60,000 sons who looking for their Ashvamedha horse, disturbed Vishnu who is sleeping in the shape of Kapila. He woke up, the brilliance in his eyes burnt all but four of Sagara's sons to ashes, leaving few survivors carrying on the family lineage. Sagara's son is King Dilipa and his grandson is Bhagiratha. On the advice of his guru Trithala, Bhagiratha did penance for a thousand years (according to god timeline) to please Ganga, to gain the release his 60,000 great-uncles from the curse of saint Kapila.
As Vishnu's incarnation: The Narada Purana enumerates two Kapilas, one as the incarnation of Brahma and another as the incarnation of Vishnu. The Puranas Bhagavata, Brahmanda, Vishnu, Padma, Skanda, Narada Purana; and the Valmiki Ramayana mentions Kapila is an incarnation of Vishnu. The Padma Purana and Skanda Purana conclusively call him Vishnu himself who descended on earth to disseminate true knowledge. Bhagavata Purana calls him Vedagarbha Vishnu. The Vishnusahasranama mentions Kapila as a name of Vishnu. In his commentary on the Samkhyasutra, Vijnanabhikshu mentions Kapila, the founder of Samkhya system, is Vishnu. Jacobsen suggests Kapila of the Veda, Śramaṇa tradition and the Mahabharata is the same person as Kapila the founder of Samkhya; and this individual is considered as an incarnation of Vishnu in the Hindu texts.
As son of Kardama muni: The Book 3 of the Bhagavata Purana, states Kapila is the son of Kardama Prajapati and his wife Devahuti. Kardama is born from Chaya, the reflection of Brahma. Brahma asks Kardama to procreate upon which Kardama goes to the banks of Sarasvati river, practices penance, visualizes Vishnu and is told by Vishnu that Manu, the son of Brahma will arrive there with his wife Shatarupa in search of a groom for their daughter Devahuti. Vishnu advises Kardama to marry Devahuti, and blesses Kardama that he himself will be born as his son. Besides Kapila as their only son, Kardama and Devahuti had nine daughters, namely Kala, Anusuya, Sraddha, Havirbhu, Gati, Kriya, Khyati, Arundhati and Shanti who were married to Marici, Atri, Angiras, Pulastya, Pulaha, Kratu, Bhrigu, Vashistha, and Atharvan respectively. H.H.Wilson notes the Bhagavatha adds a third daughter Devahuti to introduce the long legend of Kardama, and of their son Kapila, an account not found elsewhere. Kapila is described, states Daniel Sheridan, by the redactor of the Purana, as an incarnation of the supreme being Vishnu, in order to reinforce the Purana teaching by linking it to the traditional respect to Kapila's Samkhya in Hinduism. In the Bhagavata Purana, Kapila presents to his mother Devahuti, the philosophy of yoga and theistic dualism. Kapila's Samkhya is also described through Krishna to Uddhava in Book 11 of the Bhagavata Purana, a passage also known as the "Uddhava Gita".
As son of Kashyapa: The Matsya Purana mentions Kapila as the son of Kashyapa from his wife Danu, daughter of Daksha Prajapati. Kapila is one among Danu's 100 sons, and her other sons (Kapila's brothers) mentioned in the Vishnu Purana include Dvimurddha, Shankara, Ayomukha, Shankhushiras, Samvara, Ekachakra, Taraka, Vrishaparvan, Svarbhanu, Puloman, Viprachitti and other Danavas.
As son of Vitatha or Bharadwaja: In the Brahma Purana and in the Harivamsa Kapila is the son of Vitatha. Daniélou translates Vitatha to inaccuracy; and Wilson notes Bharadwaja is also named Vitatha (unprofitable); while he is given in adoption to Bharata. Vishnu Purana notes Bhavanmanyu is the son of Vitatha but Brahma Purana and Harivamsa omit this and make Suhotra, Anuhotra, Gaya, Garga, and Kapila the sons of Vitatha. The Brahma Purana differs from other puranas in saying Vitatha is the son of Bharadwaja; and upon the death of Bharata, Bharadwaja installed Vitatha as the king, before leaving for the forest.

Dharmasutras and other texts 
As son of Prahlada: The Baudhayana Dharmasutra mentions the Asura Kapila is the son of Prahlada in the chapter laying rules for the Vaikhanasas. The section IV.16 of Baudhāyana Gṛhyasūtra mentions Kapila as the one who set up rules for ascetic life. Kapila is credited, in the Baudhayana Dharmasutra, with creating the four Ashrama orders: brahmacharya, grihastha, vanaprastha and sanyassa, and suggesting that renouncer should never injure any living being in word, thought or deed. He is said to have made rules for renouncement of the sacrifices and rituals in the Vedas, and an ascetic's attachment instead to the Brahman. In other Hindu texts such as the Mahabharata, Kapila is again the sage who argues against sacrifices, and for non-violence and an end to cruelty to animals, with the argument that if sacrifices benefited the animal, then logically the family who sacrifices would benefit by a similar death.  According to Chaturvedi, in a study of inscriptions of Khajuraho temples, the early Samkhya philosophers were possibly disciples of female teachers.

Imagery in the Agamas 
Kapila's imagery is depicted with a beard, seated in padmāsana with closed eyes indicating dhyāna, with a jaṭā-maṇḍala around the head, showing high shoulders indicating he is greatly adept in controlling breath, draped in deer skin, wearing the yagñopavīta, with a kamaṇḍalu near him, with one hand placed in front of the crossed legs, and feet marked with lines resembling outline of a lotus. This Kapila is identified with Kapila the founder of Sāṅkhya system; while the Vaikhānasasāgama gives somewhat varying description. The Vaikhānasasāgama places Kapila as an āvaraņadēvāta and allocates the south-east corner of the first āvaraņa. As the embodiment of the Vedas his image is seated facing east with eight arms; of which four on the right should be in abhaya mudra, the other three should carry the Chakra, Khaḍga, Hala; one left hand is to rest on the hip in the kațyavarlambita pose and other three should carry the Ṡaṅkha, Pāśa and Daṇḍa.

Other descriptions 
The name Kapila is sometimes used as an epithet for Vasudeva with Vasudeva having incarnated in the place named Kapila.
Pradyumna assumed the form of Kapila when he became free from desire of worldly influences.
Kapila is as one of the seven Dikpalas with the other 6 being Dharma, Kala, Vasu, Vasuki, Ananta.
The Jayakhya Samhita of 5th century AD alludes to the Chaturmukha Vishnu of Kashmir and mentions Vishnu with Varaha, Nrsimha and Kapila defeated the asuras who appeared before them in zoomorphic forms with Nrsimha and Varaha posited to be incarnations of Vishnu and Kapila respectively.
In the Vamana Purana, the Yakshas were sired by Kapila with his consort Kesini who is from the Khasa class; though the epics attribute the origin of Yakshas to a cosmic egg or to the sage Pulastya; while other puranas posit Kashyapa as the progenitor of Yakshas with his consort Vishva or Khasha.
In some puranas, Kapila is also mentioned as a female, a daughter of Khaśā and a Rākșasī, after whom came the name Kāpileya gaņa. In the Mahabharat, Kapila is a daughter of Daksha  and having married Kashyapa gave birth to the Brahmanas, Kine, Gandharvas and Apsaras.
Kapila being a great teacher also had gardening as a hobby focusing his time around the babool (Acacia) tree everywhere he lived.

Kapila Devahuti Samvada 

Kapila-Devahuti Samvada is the basis of Sankhya Philosophy for which Kapila is well known. Kapila-Devahuti Samvada which roughly translates to "The Discussions between Kapila and Devahuti", touches topics on how to control oneself effectively and truly become the master of oneself. Kapila Devahuti Samvada is a text where Devahuti approaches Kapil with a dilemma. She mentions that she is fed up of satisfying her five senses. She states that all her life, she has been giving in to these senses. but they are never satisfied. Kapila explains the Samkhya philosophy to set her mind at ease and give her inner peace. This discussion is in the form of question and answers format. This has been mentioned in detail in the third canto of Shrimad Bhagavata Purana.

Jainism 
Kapila is mentioned in chapter VIII of the  Uttaradhyayana-sutra, states Larson and Bhattacharya, where a discourse of poetical verses is titled as Kaviliyam, or "Kapila's verses".

The name Kapila appears in Jaina texts. For example, in the 12th century Hemacandra's epic poem on Jain elders, Kapila appears as a Brahmin who converted to Jainism during the Nanda Empire era.
 
According to Jnatadharmakatha, Kapila is a contemporary of Krishna and the Vasudeva of Dhatakikhanda. The text further mentions that both of them blew their shankha (conch shell) together.

Buddhism 
Buddhists literature, such as the Jataka tales, state the Buddha is Kapila in one of his previous lives.

Scholars have long compared and associated the teachings of Kapila and Buddha. For example, Max Muller wrote (abridged),

Max Muller states the link between the more ancient Kapila's teachings on Buddha can be overstated. This confusion is easy, states Muller, because Kapila's first sutra in his classic Samkhya-sutra, "the complete cessation of pain, which is of three kinds, is the highest aim of man", sounds like the natural inspiration for Buddha. However, adds Muller, the teachings on how to achieve this, by Kapila and by Buddha, are very different.

As Buddhist art often depicts Vedic deities, one can find art of both Narayana and Kapila as kings within a Buddhist temple, along with statues of Buddhist figures such as Amitabha, Maitreya, and Vairocana.

In Chinese Buddhism, the Buddha directed the Yaksha Kapila and fifteen daughters of Devas to become the patrons of China.

Works
The following works were authored by Kapila, some of which are lost, and known because they are mentioned in other works; while few others are unpublished manuscripts available in libraries stated:
Manvadi Shrāddha - mentioned by Rudradeva in Pakayajna Prakasa.
Dṛṣṭantara Yoga - also named Siddhāntasāra available at Madras Oriental Manuscripts Library.
Kapilanyayabhasa - mentioned by Alberuni in his works.
Kapila Purana - referred to by Sutasamhita and Kavindracharya. Available at Sarasvati Bhavana Library, Varanasi.
Kapila Samhita - there are 2 works by the same name. One is the samhita quoted in the Bhagavatatatparyanirnaya and by Viramitrodaya in Samskaras. Another is the Samhita detailing pilgrim centers of Orissa.
Kapilasutra - Two books, namely the Samkya Pravacana Sutra and the Tattvasamasasutra, are jointly known as Kapilasutra. Bhaskararaya refers to them in his work Saubhagya-bhaskara.
Kapila Stotra - Chapters 25 to 33 of the third khanda of the Bhagavata Mahapurana are called Kapila Stotra.
Kapila Smriti - Available in the work Smriti-Sandarbha, a collection of Smritis, from Gurumandal Publications.
Kapilopanishad - Mentioned in the Anandasrama list at 4067 (Anandasrama 4067).
Kapila Gita - also known as Dṛṣṭantasara or Siddhāntasāra.
Kapila Pancharatra - also known as Maha Kapila Pancharatra. Quoted by Raghunandana in Saṃskāra Mayukha.
Ayurveda books mentioning Kapila's works are:
 Vagbhatta mentions Kapila's views in chapter 20 of Sutrasthana.
 Nischalakara mentions Kapila's views in his commentary on Chikitsa Sangraha.
 Kapila's views are quoted in Ayurvedadipika.
 The Kavindracharya list at 987 mentions a book named Kapila Siddhanta Rasayana.
 Hemadri quotes Kapila's views in Ashtangahradaya (16th verse) of the commentary Ayurveda Rasayana.
 Sarvadarsanasamgraha (Sarva-darśana-saṃgraha) mentions Kapila's views on Raseśvara school of philosophy.

Significance
Kapila, the founder of Samkhya, has been a highly revered sage in various schools of Hindu philosophy. Gaudapada (~500 CE), an Advaita Vedanta scholar, in his Bhasya called Kapila as one of the seven great sages along with Sanaka, Sananda, Sanatana, Asuri, Vodhu and Pancasikha. Patanjali, the Yoga scholar, in his Yogasutra-bhasya wrote Kapila to be the "primal wise man, or knower". The Buddhist sources mention that the city of Kapilavastu is built in the honor of Kapila. It is in Kapilavastu that the Buddha is born; and, it is here he spent the first twenty-nine years of his life.

See also
Prahlada
Narada
Vyasa
Bhakti yoga
Samkhya
Ancient Mithila University
Kapila Theertham
Kapileshwar Temple, Bihar
Kaul Village
Kalayat

Notes

References

Sources

External links

The Sánkhya Aphorisms of Kapila, 1885 translation by James R. Ballantyne, edited by Fitzedward Hall.

Ancient Indian philosophers
Hindu philosophers and theologians
Rishis
People considered avatars by their followers
Avatars of Vishnu